Arctopsyche is a genus of netspinning caddisflies in the family Hydropsychidae. There are more than 20 described species in Arctopsyche.

Species
These 27 species belong to the genus Arctopsyche:

 Arctopsyche amurensis Martynov, 1934
 Arctopsyche arcuata Schmid, 1968
 Arctopsyche bicornis Schmid, 1968
 Arctopsyche californica Ling, 1938
 Arctopsyche cervinata Mey, 1997
 Arctopsyche composita Martynov, 1930
 Arctopsyche fissa Schmid, 1968
 Arctopsyche grandis (Banks, 1900)
 Arctopsyche hirayamai Matsumura, 1931
 Arctopsyche hynreck Malicky & Chantaramongkol, 1991
 Arctopsyche inaequispinosa Schmid, 1968
 Arctopsyche inermis Banks, 1943
 Arctopsyche integra Schmid, 1968
 Arctopsyche irrorata Banks, 1905
 Arctopsyche ladogensis (Kolenati, 1859)
 Arctopsyche lobata Martynov, 1930
 Arctopsyche mesogona Mey, 1997
 Arctopsyche palpata Martynov, 1934
 Arctopsyche pluviosa Navas, 1916
 Arctopsyche reticulata (Ulmer, 1915)
 Arctopsyche shimianensis Gui & Yang, 2000
 Arctopsyche spinifera Ulmer, 1907
 Arctopsyche taiwanensis
 Arctopsyche tricornis Schmid, 1968
 Arctopsyche trispinosa Schmid, 1968
 Arctopsyche variabilis Schmid, 1968
 Arctopsyche vietnamensis Mey, 1997

References

Further reading

 
 
 

Trichoptera genera
Articles created by Qbugbot